Jheanelle Wilkins (born May 29, 1988) is an activist and American politician. A Democrat, Wilkins serves as a delegate to the Maryland General Assembly representing Maryland's District 20, the first Black woman ever elected in this district. In 2020, she was appointed by the Speaker of the House to serve as the Parliamentarian of the House of Delegates. She also serves as Chair of Election Law in the House Ways and Means Committee and as the Chair of the Legislative Black Caucus of Maryland since 2022.

Early life and education 
Wilkins was born in Kingston, Jamaica, and moved to the United States with her family when she was five. She grew up in New Castle, Delaware with her mother and older brother. She earned a bachelor of arts degree in sociology from the University of Delaware and a masters of public administration in social policy from American University. She was initiated into the Lambda Gamma chapter of Alpha Kappa Alpha sorority at the University of Delaware in Spring 2006. After moving to Silver Spring, Maryland to pursue graduate school, Jheanelle became involved with local politics and began to pursue her passion for impactful policy change. She began serving on boards and commissions such as the Montgomery County Committee on Hate/Violence, leading advocacy on social justice issues, and volunteering on local campaigns before winning election to the Montgomery County Democratic Central Committee in 2014.

Career 
Jheanelle has pursued her passion for advocacy at The Leadership Conference on Civil and Human Rights, based in Washington, D.C. since 2009. She is currently the Director of State and Local Government Affairs. At The Leadership Conference, she has played lead roles in advocating for federal immigration reform, promoting educational equity, advancing criminal justice reform, and protecting voting rights. With her organizing background, she has shaped federal and state policy; trained and engaged activists from Portland to Biloxi on progressive issues; created and implemented issue campaigns at the federal and state levels to pass legislation that promotes equality; and facilitated the participation of thousands of people in the political process. At The Leadership Conference, Jheanelle wrote and implemented a curriculum to train parents on how to be advocates in their school systems.

She is an avid public speaker and often trains advocates in various states on how to engage in the political process and lead change on issues that impact their community.

Public service and Maryland General Assembly 
In 2014, Wilkins was elected on the ballot to the Montgomery County Democratic Central Committee (MCDCC), representing District 20. The MCDCC is Montgomery County's Democratic Party, responsible for electing and supporting Democrats. While serving on the MCDCC, Wilkins created programs such as Voter Registration Week and chaired countywide voter registration. She led outreach efforts to engage new Democrats and infrequent voters.

Wilkins was appointed to the Maryland House of Delegates in January 2017. Her appointment, upon a vote by the Montgomery County Democratic Central Committee on which she sat, filled the vacancy created when William C. Smith, Jr. was elected to the Maryland Senate, who in turn filled the seat vacated by Jamie Raskin after winning a seat in the United States Congress. At the time of her appointment, Wilkins was the youngest Democratic woman in the Maryland General Assembly.

In 2018, Wilkins was victorious in a competitive primary election and was then elected to the Maryland House of Delegates to represent District 20 with 36,750 votes in the 2018 general election. In her 2017 election, Wilkins made history with two other women who became the first-ever African American women elected to the Maryland General Assembly from Montgomery County, Maryland. Wilkins is also the first African American woman to represent District 20 in the Maryland House of Delegates. In 2020, after her appointment by the Speaker of the House, Wilkins became the first African-American ever to serve as Parliamentarian of the House of Delegates. In this role, she is responsible for upholding efficient, fair, and orderly procedures as the House conducts the business of the State.

Wilkins has served on the House Ways and Means Committee since 2017. Her current subcommittees include education, revenues, and financial resources. She has sponsored numerous successful bills in her tenure, including legislation dealing with racial profiling, maternal health, tax credits for seniors and veterans, educational equity legislation, and prison reform. She is a champion for the rights of renters, affordable housing, and measures to prevent eviction.

Wilkins served as Chair of the Montgomery County Caucus and Chair of the Montgomery County Land Use, Transportation, and Public Safety Committee.

She is an active member of the Legislative Black Caucus of Maryland and the Maryland Women's Legislative Caucus. In December 2022, the Legislative Black Caucus voted to elect Wilkins as its Chair.

References 

1988 births
American politicians of Jamaican descent
Living people
Democratic Party members of the Maryland House of Delegates
People from Silver Spring, Maryland
African-American state legislators in Maryland
21st-century American politicians
21st-century American women politicians
Politicians from Kingston, Jamaica
Jamaican emigrants to the United States
University of Delaware alumni
American University alumni
Women state legislators in Maryland
People from New Castle, Delaware
21st-century African-American women
21st-century African-American politicians
20th-century African-American people
20th-century African-American women